Svoboda nad Úpou is a town in Trutnov District in the Hradec Králové Region of the Czech Republic. It has about 1,900 inhabitants. It lies in the Giant Mountains in the valley of the Úpa River.

Geography
It lies in the Giant Mountains. The town is situated in the valley of the Úpa River.

History
Based on the chronicle of Simon Hüttel, Svoboda nad Úpou was founded in 1009, the date is however unsubstantiated. The first written trustworthy mention of Svoboda nad Úpou is from 1533. In 1546, Svoboda nad Úpou was granted the status of market town by Emperor Ferdinand I, receiving all the privileges of a mining town. In 1580, Svoboda nad Úpou was promoted to a town by Emperor Rudolf II.

Later the mining stopped in the area, but in Svoboda nad Úpou became an important industrial town when paper mills were built in the 19th century. In 1871 railway was brought here. From 1938 to 1945 it was annexed by Nazi Germany and administered as part of Reichsgau Sudetenland. The local German population was expelled after World War II.

Transport
Svoboda nad Úpou is the starting point of the short local railway line to Trutnov.

Sights
The old Church of Saint Adalbert from 1584 was replaced by new Church of Saint John of Nepomuk in 1777 at the behest of Joseph I Adam of Schwarzenberg.

The Church of Saint Joseph in the local part of Dolní Maršov was built in 1927–1928.

Notable people
Franz Wende (1904–1968), ski jumper and nordic combined skier

References

External links

Cities and towns in the Czech Republic
Populated places in Trutnov District